Security Descriptor Definition Language (SDDL) defines the string format that is used to describe a security descriptor as a text string.

See also
 Security descriptor

References

External links 
 
 

Computer security software